Lieutenant-Colonel Lord Edward William Pelham-Clinton  (11 August 1836 – 9 July 1907), known as Lord Edward Clinton, was a British Liberal Party politician.

Life
Clinton was the second son of Henry Pelham-Clinton, 5th Duke of Newcastle and his wife Lady Susan Hamilton and educated at Eton until 1853.

He joined the Rifle Brigade as an ensign in 1854 and served in the Crimea after the fall of Sebastopol. He reached the rank of captain in 1857 and spent 5 years in Canada (1861–1865). In 1878 he attained the rank of lieutenant colonel and retired in 1880 while posted in India.

Clinton was elected unopposed at the 1865 general election as Member of Parliament (MP) for North Nottinghamshire, but did not seek re-election in 1868.

Clinton was Groom-in-Waiting to Queen Victoria from 1881 to 1894, then Master of the Household from September 1894 until her death in January 1901. He then reverted to a Groom-in-Waiting under her successor King Edward VII in 1901 and remained in that post until his death.

On his death he was buried in a tomb in Brookwood Cemetery. The tomb is now Grade II* listed by English Heritage.

Honours 
 KCB : Knight Commander of the Most Honourabe Order of the Bath
 GCVO : Knight Grand Cross of the Royal Victorian Order - 2 February 1901
 - 1st class, Order of the Crown - 1901 - during the visit of Emperor Wilhelm II for the death and funeral of Queen Victoria in January–February 1901

Family

On 22 August 1865, Clinton married Matilda Jane Cradock-Hartopp, daughter of Sir William Cradock-Hartopp, 3rd Baronet. The couple had no children.

As a memorial to his wife Clinton reconstructed the chancel of St Gabriel's, Warwick Square at a cost of £1,400, commissioning the architect John Francis Bentley.

References

External links 
 

1836 births
1907 deaths
People educated at Eton College
Knights Commander of the Order of the Bath
Knights Grand Cross of the Royal Victorian Order
Masters of the Household
Younger sons of dukes
Edward
UK MPs 1865–1868
Burials at Brookwood Cemetery
Liberal Party (UK) MPs for English constituencies
Rifle Brigade officers